Thomas J. Oxley is the chief executive officer of Synchron and neurointerventionist at Mount Sinai Hospital in New York City. Trained as a vascular and interventional neurologist, he established the Vascular Bionics laboratory at the University of Melbourne and is currently co-head of this lab.  Oxley is best known for founding Synchron, a company building next-generation brain computer interface solutions that has recently announced the first clinical data on a novel stent electrode (Stentrode) neural interface that is inserted through blood vessels. The company was initiated sometime after his cold-call to DARPA for funding, and has received substantial funding from the U.S. Defense Advanced Research Projects Agency (DARPA) and the Australian government to research this minimally-invasive neural interface technology.

Work in brain-computer interface 

While Oxley has been conducting research in motor systems since 2003, he is said to have conceived the idea for the Stentrode™ in 2007 and he led the original team at the University of Melbourne that created the technology. Stentrode is the first motor neuroprosthesis, a form of brain-computer interface implanted via the patient's blood vessels. Oxley's team in Australia was the only non-US-based group funded by DARPA as part of the Reliable Neural-Interface Technology (RE-NET) program and led by Professor Jack Judy.

Dr. Oxley announced in a 2018 TEDxSydney Talk that the company, Synchron, would initiate clinical trials of the Stentrode device with the goal of assisting paralyzed patients to regain independence.

Just two years later, Oxley and Synchron published a first-in-human study on the device in the Journal of NeuroInterventional Surgery. The study showed the ability of two Australians with ALS to email, text, shop, and bank online using the Stentrode Device, and was conducted at Royal Melbourne Hospital. Earlier in 2020, the company had announced that it received Breakthrough Device status from the US Food and Drug Administration (FDA) for the Stentrode.

Oxley's work has been published in major journals including Nature Biotechnology and New England Journal of Medicine, and he is the founder of three start-up companies: SmartStent  (which was acquired by Synchron, Inc.), VascuLab and Synchron.

COVID-19 research 
Oxley and his colleagues at Mt. Sinai reported an increased incidence of stroke identified in patients under 50 years of age with COVID-19, which was published in New England Journal of Medicine in April 2020.

Education 
After earning bachelor's degrees in medical science, medicine and surgery from the University of Monash in Melbourne Australia, Oxley earned doctorate degrees in philosophy and neuroscience from the University of Melbourne. His training included advanced MRI imaging analysis, hardware device (stent) development, and electrophysiological signal processing. Oxley completed residencies in both internal medicine and neurology, as well as a stroke fellowship. From 2015 – 2017, Oxley completed an endovascular neurosurgery fellowship at Mount Sinai Hospital in New York under Professor J. Mocco and Professor Alejandro Berenstein.

Scientific career 
Dr Oxley has published 100 internationally peer reviewed articles that have accumulated over 6500 citations, with 13 as first or last author and with an H Index of 20.

Honors and awards 
In 2018, Oxley won the 2018 Global Australian Advance Award Winner, an award given to celebrate international Australians who exhibit remarkable talent, exceptional vision and ambition, the UNESCO Netexplo award for Innovation, and was a finalist for the Congress of Neurological Surgeons Innovator of the Year Award.

 2020	Australian of the Year Award Finalist 
 2018	GQ Australia Innovator of the Year finalist
 2018 	Advance Global Overall Australian of the Year Award 
 2018	Advance Global Australia Award for Life Sciences
 2018	Congress of Neurological Surgeons (USA), 2018 Innovator of the Year
 2018	UNESCO Netexplo award for Innovation, Paris, France
 2017	Chancellor's Prize for Excellence in a PhD Thesis, University of Melbourne
 2017	Dean's Award for Excellence in a PhD Thesis, University of Melbourne
 2017	International INDEX Design Awards Finalist, Stentrode, Copenhagen, Denmark
 2017	Graham Brown Best Publication Award, University of Melbourne
 2016	Premier's Award (Victoria) for Health and Medical Research (PhD) commendation 
 2016	International Brain Computer Interface Award Finalist 
 2016	SMART 100 companies
 2016	Nomination for University of Melbourne Chancellor's PhD Award
 2013	Warren Haynes Fellowship in Neurology
 2013	NHMRC Postgraduate Scholarship
 2013	Winner, MTGT Entrepreneurial Accelerator

References 

Monash University alumni
University of Melbourne alumni
Academic staff of the University of Melbourne
Chief executives in the technology industry
Australian neuroscientists
1980 births
Living people
Place of birth missing (living people)
Nationality missing